Lyambo Mara Etshele (born 29 August 1968) is a Congolese former professional footballer who played as a midfielder. He was a squad member of the Zaire national team at the 1992 Africa Cup of Nations.

Career
On 13 March 1990, while at French Division 3 club Gazélec Ajaccio, Etshele scored in his club's 3–1 loss against Marseille in the round of 16 of the 1989–90 Coupe de France. At the end of the season, Gazélec Ajaccio achieved promotion to French Division 2.

Honours
Gazélec Ajaccio
 Promotion to French Division 2: 1989–90

References

1968 births
Living people
Democratic Republic of the Congo footballers
Footballers from Kinshasa
Association football midfielders
Democratic Republic of the Congo international footballers
1992 African Cup of Nations players
Ligue 1 players
Ligue 2 players
Gazélec Ajaccio players
Valenciennes FC players
Lille OSC players
Le Havre AC players
Democratic Republic of the Congo expatriate footballers
Expatriate footballers in France
Democratic Republic of the Congo expatriate sportspeople in France
21st-century Democratic Republic of the Congo people